A Song of Ice and Fire Roleplaying is a role-playing game published by Green Ronin Publishing in 2009.

Description
A Song of Ice and Fire Roleplaying is an adaptation of the A Song of Ice and Fire novel series.  The game uses Green Ronin's "Chronicle System".

Publication history
On 24 April 2007, it was on George R.R. Martin's website that Green Ronin Publishing was producing a new line of A Song of Ice and Fire RPG products, unrelated to the earlier Guardians of Order A Game of Thrones effort. Robert J. Schwalb designed the A Song of Ice and Fire Roleplaying game, which was previewed in 2008 and published in 2009; this was his last project for Green Ronin before he moved over to Wizards of the Coast. The Green Ronin game, titled A Song of Ice and Fire Roleplaying (SIFRP), went on sale on 10 March 2009: it uses a custom game system and does not contain rules from either the d20 or Tri-Stat dX systems.

Reception
A Song of Ice and Fire Roleplaying won the 2009 Silver ENnie Award for Best Rules.

References

ENnies winners
Fantasy role-playing games
Games based on A Song of Ice and Fire
Green Ronin Publishing games
Role-playing games based on novels
Role-playing games introduced in 2009